William Felix Trotter (August 10, 1908 – August 26, 1984) was a Major League Baseball pitcher. He played all or part of seven seasons in the majors, between 1937 and 1944, for the St. Louis Browns, Washington Senators and St. Louis Cardinals.

References

External links

Major League Baseball pitchers
St. Louis Browns players
Washington Senators (1901–1960) players
St. Louis Cardinals players
Scottdale Scotties players
Waynesboro Red Birds players
Terre Haute Tots players
Springfield Pirates players
Portsmouth Pirates players
San Antonio Missions players
Rochester Red Wings players
Anniston Rams players
Little Rock Travelers players
Milwaukee Brewers (minor league) players
Beaumont Exporters players
Baseball players from Illinois
1908 births
1984 deaths